The 1992 Scottish Cup Final was played between Rangers and Airdrieonians, at Hampden Park, Glasgow, on 9 May 1992.

Rangers won the match 2–1. They opened the scoring with a goal by Mark Hateley in the 30th minute, a finish from six yards after a low cross from the left. Ally McCoist made it 2–0 with a half volley, before Andy Smith scored a consolation goal from outside the box.

Rangers' route to the final was unusual in that they faced Scottish Premier Division opposition in every round, beating 1990 winners Aberdeen, 1991 winners Motherwell, St Johnstone and 1989 winners Celtic before facing Airdrie. McCoist scored the only goal of the semi-final win over Celtic at Hampden, the first goal his club had scored in an Old Firm fixture in the competition since 1973.

Match details

References

1992
Cup Final
Scottish Cup Final 1992
Scottish Cup Final 1992
1990s in Glasgow
May 1992 sports events in the United Kingdom